Frederick W. Velguth (March 13, 1838 – April 9, 1914) was an architect in Milwaukee, Wisconsin. Several buildings he designed are listed on the National Register of Historic Places.

He came to Milwaukee from Magdeburg, Germany, in 1858.

He began his career as a carpenter. He designed elaborate staircases.

He married Sophia Junger in 1862.

Work
Charles Abresch House, 2126 W. Juneau Avenue in Milwaukee, NRHP listed 
Christ Evangelical Lutheran Church (1901) at 2235 W. Greenfield Avenue in Milwaukee, NRHP listed
Trinity Evangelical Lutheran Church (1878) at 1046 N. 9th Street in Milwaukee, NRHP listed; suffered a major fire in 2018.
Trinity Evangelical Lutheran Church (1884) at 10729 West Freistadt Road in Mequon, Wisconsin
Zion Lutheran Church at 912 N. Oneida Street in Appleton, Wisconsin, NRHP listed
Republican House
Arcadia Lutheran Church (1888) in Arcadia, Michigan
Adolph Schoenleber Building
German Theater
Skating rink

References

External links
Findagrave entry

1838 births
1914 deaths
American architects
German expatriates in the United States
People from Milwaukee
Architects from Magdeburg